Richard Taylor  (born November 5, 1985) is a former American football cornerback. He was signed by the New York Jets as a street free agent in 2011. He played college football at the University of Maryland.

Early years
Taylor played tailback for Centerville High School in Fairfax County, Virginia and led the State in rushing yards during his senior year. He was one of the few ten high school seniors in the country to gray shirt and enrolled early at the University of Maryland.  He was also a standout basketball player, averaging over 15 points per game.

College career
He joined the University of Maryland in the Spring Semester, 2004 as a Safety. He was later moved to a Cornerback in 2005.  He also joined the Track and Field team in 2006 and 2007.  He was one of only four players to letter in two sports during the tenure of Coach Ralph Friedgen.  In addition to producing as a football player, he produced top ten all time in the 100-meter dash at the University of Maryland.  As a Terp, he played in the Champs Bowl, Emerald Bowl, and Humanitarian Bowl.  During pro-day, he posted a record of 30 reps of 225 lbs. in the bench press and also ran a 4.4 in the 40.

Taylor maintained a strong academic performance while playing sports for the Terps.  He graduated in three years with a Bachelor of Arts in Communications.  After completing his bachelor's degree, he enrolled in the Master's Program in Real Estate Development, reflecting a vision for addressing the broad range of skills and knowledge important in creating viable, attractive and sustainable communities.  He completed his master's degree in the Spring of 2009, becoming the first athlete to complete both his bachelor's and master's degrees prior to completing his athletic eligibility.

During his last year as a Maryland football player, he was accepted in the Student Career Experience Program with the Office of Realty of the Federal Highway Administration, U.S. Department of Transportation.

Professional career

Pre-draft

Detroit Lions
Taylor participated in the Detroit Lions minicamp in May 2010 however, he was not signed to a contract.

New York Jets
Taylor signed a future contract with the New York Jets on January 12, 2011. He was waived on August 17.

Personal
He is named after his grandfather, Richard Brown of Edisto Island, South Carolina.  He is son of Curtis Taylor, a retired Colonel in the U.S. Army and Abigail Taylor, a retired Speech Pathologist with Fairfax County, Virginia.  He has two older brothers: Curtis Taylor, Jr. who played football for Purdue University, Indiana where he was a standout football player; and Steven Taylor, who played football at South Carolina State. He is also the nephew of former three-star Admiral David L. Brewer.  He is also a member of the Omega Psi Phi fraternity.

References

External links
Maryland Terrapins bio

1985 births
Living people
American football cornerbacks
New York Jets players
People from Centreville, Virginia
Players of American football from Virginia
Maryland Terrapins football players